Zakhmee is a 1975 Hindi movie. Produced by Tahir Hussain, the film was directed by Raja Thakur. It stars Sunil Dutt, Asha Parekh, Rakesh Roshan, Reena Roy, Tariq, Helen, Johnny Walker, Agha, Iftekhar in pivotal roles. The music was composed by Bappi Lahiri, who later said that this film was his first claim to fame. The film performed "Above Average" at the box office, according to one source.

Plot
On the night of his marriage to Asha (Asha Parekh), Anand (Sunil Dutt) is arrested for allegedly murdering his business partner, and held in prison until his trial takes place. Anand refuses to say anything in his favor, thus leading his lawyer to conclude that Anand did commit this homicide. Refusing to believe that their brother could murder, his brothers, Amar and Pawan (Rakesh Roshan and Tariq respectively) kidnap Judge Ganguly's (Iftekhar) only daughter, Nisha (Reena Roy), in order to force the judge to find Anand not guilty, with disastrous results.

Cast
Sunil Dutt as Anand 
Asha Parekh as Asha
Rakesh Roshan as Amar  
Reena Roy as Nisha 
Tariq as Pawan 
Helen as Sheela 
Johnny Walker as Johny 
Imtiaz Khan as Tiger 
Yunus Parvez as Dilawar 
Jankidas as Jankidas

Soundtrack

References

External links 
 

1975 films
1970s Hindi-language films
Films scored by Bappi Lahiri